Thomas Gold (1920–2004) was an Austrian-born astrophysicist.

Thomas Gold may also refer to:

 Thomas R. Gold (1764–1827), United States Representative from New York
 Thomas Gold (DJ) (born 1981), German DJ and producer
 Tom Gold (dancer), ballet dancer
 Tom Gold (rally driver), English rally driver